Hollyville is an unincorporated community in Sussex County, Delaware, United States. It is one of the Three Sisters communities consisting of Fairmount, Hollyville, and Hollymount. Hollyville is the area located around the intersections of Delaware Route 24 Alternate (Sussex County Road 48) and Sussex County Road 290.

The community is part of the Salisbury, Maryland-Delaware Metropolitan Statistical Area.

References

Unincorporated communities in Sussex County, Delaware
Unincorporated communities in Delaware